Keegan Mitchell Murray (born August 19, 2000) is an American professional basketball player for the Sacramento Kings of the National Basketball Association (NBA). He was selected fourth overall in the 2022 NBA draft.

High school career
Murray played basketball for Prairie High School in Cedar Rapids, Iowa. As a senior he averaged 20.3 points and 7.2 rebounds per game and was named Metro Player of the Year. Murray spent a postgraduate year at DME Academy in Daytona Beach, Florida to gain more exposure. He averaged 22.1 points and 7.5 rebounds per game, earning most outstanding player honors at the National Prep School Invitational. A three-star recruit, he committed to playing college basketball for Iowa.

College career

On January 2, 2021, Murray recorded a freshman season-high 14 points, nine rebounds, three steals and three blocks in a 77–75 win over Rutgers. As a freshman, he averaged 7.2 points, 5.1 rebounds and 1.3 blocks per game, earning Big Ten All-Freshman Team honors. On November 16, 2021, Murray posted 27 points, 21 rebounds and four blocks in an 86–69 win against North Carolina Central. It was the first 20-point, 20-rebound game by an Iowa player since Bruce King in 1977. On November 29, he suffered an ankle injury during a 75-74 win over Virginia, forcing him to miss a game. On December 18, Murray scored 35 points in a 94-75 victory over Utah State. He scored a career-high 37 points on February 13, 2022, in a 98-75 win against Nebraska. As a sophomore, Murray was named to the First Team All-Big Ten, and won the Karl Malone Award as the nation's top power forward. Additionally, he helped lead the Hawkeyes to a 2022 Big Ten men's basketball tournament championship, being named Big Ten tournament Most Outstanding Player. On March 29, 2022, Murray declared for the 2022 NBA draft, forgoing his remaining college eligibility.

Professional career

Sacramento Kings (2022–present) 
In the 2022 NBA draft, Murray was selected with the fourth overall pick by the Sacramento Kings. He made his summer league debut on July 2 against the Golden State Warriors, putting up 26 points and eight rebounds in an 86–68 win. Murray was named NBA Summer League MVP averaging 23 points, seven rebounds, two assists, one steal, while shooting 50% from the field and 40% from three-point range. He was also named to the All-NBA Summer League First Team. On October 22, Murray made his regular season debut, putting up 19 points, five rebounds, and two blocks in a 111–109 loss to the Los Angeles Clippers.

On January 20, 2023, Murray put up a career-high 29 points and a career-high 14 rebounds in a 118–113 win over the Oklahoma City Thunder.

Career statistics

College

|-
| style="text-align:left;"| 2020–21
| style="text-align:left;"| Iowa
| 31 || 4 || 18.0 || .506 || .296 || .755 || 5.1 || .5 || .8 || 1.3 || 7.2
|-
| style="text-align:left;"| 2021–22
| style="text-align:left;"| Iowa
| 35 || 35 || 31.9 || .554 || .398 || .747 || 8.7 || 1.5 || 1.3 || 1.9 || 23.5
|- class="sortbottom"
| style="text-align:center;" colspan="2"| Career
| 66 || 39 || 25.4 || .543 || .373 || .749 || 7.0 || 1.0 || 1.1 || 1.6 || 15.8

Personal life
Murray's father, Kenyon, played college basketball for Iowa. He has been a teammate of his twin brother, Kris, in high school and college.

References

External links

Iowa Hawkeyes bio

2000 births
Living people
All-American college men's basketball players
American men's basketball players
American twins
Basketball players from Iowa
Iowa Hawkeyes men's basketball players
Power forwards (basketball)
Sacramento Kings draft picks
Sacramento Kings players
Small forwards
Sportspeople from Cedar Rapids, Iowa
Twin sportspeople